Yuri Anatolyevich Chursin (born 11 March 1980) is a Russian actor who is known for Playing the Victim, The Three Musketeers and Mafia: The Game of Survival.

Life and career
Yuri Chursin was born in Priozersk, Karaganda Region, Kazakh Soviet Socialist Republic, Soviet Union (now Kazakhstan), in the Russian family of a soldier. 
In 1997 he graduated from the Lyceum № 17 of the city of Khimki, Moscow Oblast.

In 2001 he graduated from the acting department of the Boris Shchukin Theatre Institute and was accepted to the troupe of the State Academic Theater named after E. Vakhtangov.

In 2022 Chursin starred in Amore More - a dramedy series about poly-amorous relationships.

In the same year he also starred in fantasy series Aeterna based on books by writer Vera Kamsha.

Selected filmography

Award and nominations
 2007 - Russian National Movie Awards
 Best Russian Actor Nominee
 2007 - Nika Award
 Discovery of the Year Nominee for the film Playing the Victim
 2012 - Golden Eagle Award (Russia)
 Best Television Actor Nominee for the TV series Prison Break
 2014 - Russian National Movie Awards
 Best Russian Actor of the Decade Nominee

References

External links

 
 
 
 Yuri Chursin at Russia-1 
 Yuri Chursin at ruskino.ru 
 Yuri Chursin at rusactors.ru 

1980 births
Living people
People from Karaganda Region
Russian male film actors
Russian male television actors
Russian male stage actors
20th-century Russian male actors
21st-century Russian male actors